The women's skeleton event at the 2014 Winter Olympics took place at the Sliding Center Sanki on 13–14 February. In the first run, Lizzy Yarnold established the track record of 58.43 seconds and the start record of 4.95 seconds. The start record was improved to 4.89 seconds in the same run by Elena Nikitina. In the third run, Yarnold improved her own track record to 57.91. Winning all four runs, Yarnold became the Olympic champion; Noelle Pikus-Pace of the United States won silver, and Nikitina became the bronze medalist. Each of them won their first Olympic medal. Yarnold's medal was the first gold medal for Great Britain at the 2014 Olympics.

Standing records
While the IOC does not consider skeleton times eligible for Olympic records, the FIBT does maintain records for both the start and a complete run at each track it competes.

Results
TR – Track Record (in italics for previous marks). Top finish in each run is in boldface. For the second and fourth runs, athletes start in reverse order in relation to their current standings.

On 22 November 2017, bronze medalist Elena Nikitina was stripped of her medal and Olga Potylitsina and Maria Orlova were also disqualified. On 1 February 2018, their results were restored as a result of the successful appeal.

References

Skeleton at the 2014 Winter Olympics
Women's events at the 2014 Winter Olympics